Birds described in 1899 include tiny sunbird, brown-rumped tapaculo, golden-backed whistler, grey-necked rockfowl, Corsican finch, Dohrn's thrush-babbler, forest double-collared sunbird, tawny-backed fantail, Socotra bunting, rufous-cheeked laughingthrush, white-winged magpie, Vanuatu kingfisher, star-spotted nightjar

Events 
Death of John Whitehead, Louis d'Hamonville, Carl Constantin Platen, Elliott Coues, Joseph Wolf
Harriman Alaska expedition
William Louis Abbott begins exploring the islands of Maritime Southeast Asia on the schooner "Terrapin" often accompanied by Cecil Boden Kloss.
Einar Lönnberg explores the Caspian Sea.
Harry Forbes Witherby devotes himself to ornithology

Publications
Richard Bowdler Sharpe A hand-list of the genera and species of birds : nomenclator avium tum fossilium tum viventium.London :Trustees of the British Museum 1899–1909.online BHL
Émile Oustalet, 1899 Oiseaux du Cambodge, du Laos, de l'Annam et du Tonkin, (Birds of Cambodia, Laos, Annam and Tonkin).
Howard Saunders Illustrated Manual of British Birds London, Gurney and Jackson online BHL
Robert Hall A key to the birds of Australia and Tasmania with their geographical distribution in Australia Melbourne, Melville, Mullen and Slade, [pref 1899] online BHL
Outram Bangs The hummingbirds of the Santa Marta Region of Colombia American Ornithologists' Union, New York (1899) online
Anton Reichenow (1899) Die Vögel der Bismarckinseln Mitteilungen aus dem Zoologischen Museum Berlin – 1_3: 1 - 106.online Zobodat
 R.B. and J.D.S. Woodward.Natal birds:including the species belonging to Natal and the eastern districts of the Cape Colony Pietermaritzburg : P. Davis, 1899.
Ernst Hartert and Walter Rothschild A Review of the Ornithology of the Galapagos Islands, with Notes on the Webster-Harris Expedition. By the Hon. Walter Rothschild, and Ernst Hartert.Nov. Zoolvi. p. 85 (1899)

Ongoing events
Osbert Salvin and Frederick DuCane Godman 1879–1904. Biologia Centrali-Americana. Aves
Members of the German Ornithologists' Society in Journal für Ornithologie online BHL
The Ibis
Novitates Zoologicae
Ornithologische Monatsberichte Verlag von R. Friedländer & Sohn, Berlin. Years of publication: 1893–1938 online Zobodat
Ornis; internationale Zeitschrift für die gesammte Ornithologie.Vienna 1885-1905online BHL
The Auk online BHL

References

Bird
Birding and ornithology by year